Cyamops samoensis is a species of fly.

References

samoensis
Insects described in 2000